Ellen Kathleen Pompeo (born November 10, 1969) is an American actress. She is best known for her role on Grey's Anatomy as the titular Dr. Meredith Grey. One of the world's highest-paid actors since 2017, she has made multiple appearances on the Forbes’ year-end lists. Her accolades include a Screen Actors Guild Award and a Golden Globe Award nomination.

Born in Everett, Massachusetts, Pompeo moved to Miami and then New York City, where a casting director discovered her and signed her for an ad campaign for L'Oreal. She made her screen debut with NBC's legal drama Law & Order, then guest-starred in other television shows, including the comedy Strangers with Candy, the medical drama Strong Medicine and the sitcom Friends. She made her feature film debut in 1999 with the romantic comedy Coming Soon, and went on to play minor roles in films like In the Weeds and Mambo Café but found little initial success. A turning point came in her career in 2002, when she gained wide recognition for her starring role in Brad Silberling's romantic drama Moonlight Mile.

Pompeo was then cast in ABC's popular medical drama Grey's Anatomy, and gained worldwide recognition for her portrayal of the title character Dr. Meredith Grey. The role on the long-running series earned her a Screen Actors Guild Award. The character became widely popular, making Pompeo one of the most renowned television actresses. In 2016, she was ranked fourth in the list of highest paid TV actresses by Forbes, with earnings of $14.9 million; she became the third highest-paid female and the fifth highest-paid actor overall in 2018 with earnings of $23.6 million. She was also the highest-ranked actress from a drama series on the list.

Pompeo's other film roles include the comedy Old School (2003), the superhero film Daredevil (2003), the caper film Art Heist (2004), and the comedy drama Life of the Party (2005). In addition to her acting career, she has directed two episodes of Grey's Anatomy and founded a production company, Calamity Jane. She has been married to music producer Chris Ivery since 2007; they have three children.

Early life
Pompeo was born in Everett, Massachusetts, on November 10, 1969. Her father was born in Gesualdo, Italy, and was of Italian, English, and Irish descent; and her mother of Irish ancestry. She was raised as a Catholic. Her mother died of an accidental painkiller overdose when she was four. Her father remarried soon after; he died on September 1, 2012. In 2006, Pompeo said, "I think having my mother die at such a very young age—when she was 39—[made me] appreciate life so much." She has five older siblings: three sisters  and two brothers. She was nicknamed "the pencil", and "stracciatella" (gelato flavor). She worked as a bartender in Miami when she started dating her then boyfriend. They moved to New York City in 1995, where she was approached by a casting director to appear in ads for Citibank and L'Oreal.

Career

1995–2004: Career beginnings 
Pompeo's early work included adverts and small independent films. She made her television debut in 1996 by guest-starring in the NBC legal police drama Law & Order. She made her feature film debut in Coming Soon (1999), playing a small part. She made her second appearance in Law & Order in 2000, and then guest-starred on Strangers with Candy, Strong Medicine, and Friends. She then moved to Los Angeles in 2001. She participated in the movie Mambo Café with Thalía.

In 2002, Pompeo was selected by director Brad Silberling for a lead role in his film Moonlight Mile, playing Jake Gyllenhaal's character's sympathetic love interest. While generally praising the cast, Jeff Vice of Deseret News noted Pompeo's "extremely appealing" performance. Other commentators considered her performance worthy of an Academy Award. Also in 2002, Pompeo appeared in the biographical crime drama film Catch Me If You Can; and in 2003, she appeared in Old School as Luke Wilson's love interest. She portrayed Jim Carrey's ex-girlfriend, Naomi, in the 2004 film Eternal Sunshine of the Spotless Mind. Although her scenes were cut from that film, she felt grateful that director Michel Gondry selected her for it. She played the role of Karen Page in the 2003 film Daredevil, and the following year, she starred in Art Heist.

2005–2010: Grey's Anatomy and other works 
Pompeo landed her first major role in 2005 on the ABC medical drama series Grey's Anatomy, created by Shonda Rhimes. She has played the title character and series' protagonist, Meredith Grey, a surgical intern at the fictional Seattle Grace Hospital since the show's pilot episode. Grey's Anatomy was a breakout hit in 2005 and was well received by television critics.

At the time of the show's inception, Pompeo received positive feedback for her performance, with Newsdays Diane Werts writing, "star Ellen Pompeo's newly-minted Dr. Grey conveys such substance that you simply can't stop watching."

Pompeo signed a new contract for Grey's Anatomy in 2011 that increased her salary to US$200,000 per episode; she was subsequently named the eighth highest-paid TV actress in 2012, earning $9 million. The contract would have her involved with the show until its 12th season. Under her renewed deal of 2013, she earned $350,000 per episode, with additional payment from syndication. At this point, she was ranked fourth in the list of highest-paid television actresses again in 2015, in the Forbes list, with the earnings of $11.5 million. Pompeo's contract with the company expired again at the end of the 12th season along with the other original cast members, and she signed a new one with an increased paycheck. She held on the fourth spot in Forbes''' list in 2016, bringing in $14 million, a 32% increase in the earnings from 2015.

With the increasing popularity of the show, Pompeo garnered worldwide reputation among television viewers. Her performance has garnered her five People's Choice Award nominations, with three wins. At the 37th People's Choice Awards, she was nominated against Dempsey and Oh in the Favorite TV Doctor category, and the following year, she garnered a nomination in the Favorite TV Drama Actress category, an award that she has won thrice at the 39th, 41st, and the 42nd People's Choice Awards. Pompeo has been nominated for several other awards for her performances in the show. She and the Grey's Anatomy cast won Best Ensemble in a Television Series at the 2006 Satellite Awards. During the following year's ceremony, she was named Best Actress in a Television Drama Series. She was among the Grey's Anatomy cast members awarded the award for Outstanding Performance by an Ensemble in a Drama Series at the 13th Screen Actors Guild Awards, and received nominations in the same category in 2006 and 2008. Pompeo received a nomination for Best Performance by an Actress in a Drama Series at the 64th Golden Globe Awards – the program won Best Drama Series at the same ceremony. In 2007, Pompeo and the female cast and crew of Grey's Anatomy received the Women in Film Lucy Award, which honors those "whose work in television has positively influenced attitudes toward women." The same year, she starred in Life of the Party.

In 2007, Pompeo was honored by the National Italian American Foundation for her achievement in entertainment at a black-tie gala in Washington, D.C. In the same year, show-business awards reporter Tom O'Neil commented that Pompeo was overdue for an Emmy Award nomination for her role in Grey's Anatomy. The view was echoed by later critics, including Mary McNamara of the Los Angeles Times who suggested that Pompeo, "who has worked very hard and against all narrative odds to make Meredith Grey an interesting character at last" should have received a nomination at the 61st Primetime Emmy Awards. During the twelfth season of the show, Western Gazettes Alex Hawnkings gave Pompeo credit for carrying the show and re-iterated it was time for her to finally win an Emmy Award. Readers of O'Neil's awards website, The Envelope, included Pompeo in their 2009 nominations for Best Drama Actress in the site's Gold Derby TV Awards.

 2011–present: Professional expansion 
On October 27, 2011, Deadline Hollywood reported that Pompeo had launched her own production company called Calamity Jane which sold its first project to ABC, an untitled show about female agents on the Secretary of State's security detail. During a 2014 BuzzFeed event, she expressed a lack of interest in acting after Grey's Anatomy completes its run; she explained: "I definitely feel myself transitioning. I don't find acting terribly empowering." Since then, Pompeo has been involved in other projects as a producer and had also made her directorial debut with a Grey's Anatomy episode, from the thirteenth season. In August 2014, it was announced that Pompeo was developing two dramas with ABC Studios - an adaptation of Rachel Carey's 2013 novel Debt for ABC Family, and an untitled female police drama for ABC. Pompeo is also involved with a Spanish thriller Motivos Personales with the London-based company, New Media Vision. Pompeo appeared in the music video for Taylor Swift's 2015 single "Bad Blood", and two years later, she voiced a stuffed animal cat in Doc McStuffins.

In January 2018, she renewed her contract for Grey's Anatomy, agreeing for two more seasons; she became the highest-paid actress in a television drama series, earning more than $20 million a year with the new deal. She received a sum of $575,000 per episode under her new contract and was promoted to the rank of producer for the series, which was estimated to earn her a separate $6 million to $7 million annually. She was also listed as co-producer for the Grey's Anatomy spinoff titled Station 19 and received office space for Calamity Jane at Walt Disney Studios. She wrote a piece on the issue of the gender pay gap and her new contract with ABC, which was featured as the cover story for the January 2018 issue of The Hollywood Reporter. Forbes ranked Pompeo as the third highest female and the fifth highest actor overall on its 2018 list of highest paid TV actors on television; she had estimated earnings of US$23.5 million.

In 2019, she appeared as a guest judge on the fourth season of RuPaul's Drag Race All Stars. More recently, her production company and ABC bought out the rights to the Paradise book trilogy.

Personal life
Pompeo met Chris Ivery in a Los Angeles grocery store in 2003. They began dating after 6 months of friendship and got married in 2007, with the New York City mayor Michael Bloomberg as the legal witness to the ceremony. They have two daughters and a son together.

Pompeo heavily criticized media reports suggesting that she suffered from an eating disorder, calling the media irresponsible for promoting such rumors. In a 2007 issue of Los Angeles Confidential Magazine, she said that she was worried about the young girls who look up to her: "I don't want them to think I starve myself or don't eat, and that to be like me that's what they have to do."

Pompeo, along with Shonda Rhimes and the leads of Rhimes' ABC Thursday line-up shows, Scandal's Kerry Washington and How to Get Away With Murder'''s Viola Davis, appeared in an ad campaign for the 2016 US election supporting Hillary Clinton, comparing her to the protagonists of those series. In the video, the actresses note that Olivia Pope, Annalise Keating and Meredith Grey are "brilliant" and "complex" women who fight for justice and give voice to the voiceless. Rhimes, Davis, Pompeo, and Washington each take turns speaking as they praise the presidential candidate and conclude: "Our characters are on television; the real world has Hillary Clinton." Clinton responded to the video with a tweet saying, "Talk about a power lineup. Thank you for being on this team!"

Filmography

Film

Television

Music videos

As director

As producer

Awards and nominations

References

External links

 
 

1969 births
20th-century American actresses
21st-century American actresses
Actresses from Massachusetts
American film actresses
American people of English descent
American people of Irish descent
American people of Italian descent
American television actresses
American voice actresses
Living people
People from Everett, Massachusetts